Niue is a small, oval island in the South Pacific Ocean, to the east of Tonga.  It has an area of 260 square kilometres, and a coastline of 64 km.  It claims an exclusive economic zone of 200 nm, and a territorial sea of 12 nm.  It is one of world's largest coral islands.

Climate 
Niue's climate is tropical, modified by south-east trade winds. Cyclones pose a natural hazard.

Terrain 

The terrain consists of steep coastal cliffs made from limestone and a central plateau. The lowest point is at sea level, and the highest is an unnamed point near Mutalau settlement, at 68 m.

Natural resources 
The island's natural resources are fish and arable land. Land use in 1993 was as in the following table:

Environmental issues 
A current environmental issue is increasing attention to conservationist practices to counter loss of soil fertility from traditional slash-and-burn agriculture. Niue is a party to the following international agreements regarding the environment: Biodiversity, Climate Change-Kyoto Protocol, Desertification. Niue has signed but not ratified the Law of the Sea agreement.

Boundaries
Niue has signed a treaty with the United States in which the parties delimited the east–west maritime boundary between Niue and American Samoa. Niue is south of American Samoa.

Extreme points 

This is a list of the extreme points of Niue, the points that are farther north, south, east or west than any other location.

 Northernmost point – unnamed headland north-west of Uluvehi
 Easternmost point – unnamed headland south-east of Liku
 Southernmost point – Limufuafua Point
 Westernmost point -  Halagigie Point

References

External links
 Maritime Zones Act 2013
 Exclusive Economic Zone Outer Limit Notice 2013